Gutenberg is a lunar impact crater that lies along the west edge of Mare Fecunditatis, in the eastern part of the visible Moon. It is named after German inventor Johannes Gutenberg.  To the southeast are the craters Goclenius, Magelhaens and Colombo. To the west-southwest is the crater Gaudibert, across the Montes Pyrenaeus that run south from Gutenberg.

The rim of Gutenberg is worn and eroded, most notably in the east where it is broken by the overlapping crater Gutenberg E. This crater in turn has gaps in its southeast and southwest rims, forming a passage to the lunar mare to the east. There are also clefts and valleys in the southern rim where it joins Gutenberg C. The crater Gutenberg A intrudes into the southwest rim.

The floors of Gutenberg and Gutenberg E have been flooded in the past by lava, forming a relatively flat plain across the bottom. This surface is broken across the northeast by a pair of clefts that form a part of the Rimae Goclenius. These extend northwest from the Goclenius region. The central rise of Gutenberg is a semi-circular range of hills that are the most prominent in the south, and the concave part lies open to the east. The floor is otherwise not marred by any significant craters.

Satellite craters
By convention these features are identified on lunar maps by placing the letter on the side of the crater midpoint that is closest to Gutenberg.

References

External links

 Lunar Photo of the Day, "Land of Manna", October 5, 2006, showing Gutenberg and vicinity

Impact craters on the Moon
Johannes Gutenberg